Isaac Davis (c. 1758–1810) was a Welsh advisor to Kamehameha I, who recruited him to help conquer the other kingdoms in Hawaii, resulting in formation of the Kingdom of Hawaii. Davis and John Young became friends and advisors to Kamehameha. Davis brought western military knowledge to Hawaii and played a prominent role during Hawaii's first contacts with the European powers. He spent the rest of his life in Hawaii and was known as Aikake.

Life
Isaac Davis was born about 1758 in Milford Haven, Wales. He was a seaman on the American schooner Fair American, commanded by Thomas Humphrey Metcalfe, engaged with a larger companionship, the Eleanora, in the maritime fur trade between the Pacific Northwest and China.

In 1790, the Eleanora was under Captain Simon Metcalfe, when one of his skiffs was stolen by chief Kaōpūiki at Honuaula on Maui. Metcalfe nevertheless invited the locals to trade with him, only to fire his cannons at the approaching canoes with unarmed traders, killing more than 100 Hawaiians at Olowalu.

Metcalfe also once mistreated Kameeiamoku, a high chief on the island of Hawaii, and one of the sacred pio twins, by whipping him. The humiliated Kameeiamoku swore vengeance on the next ship to arrive. He attacked The Fair American at Kaūpūlehu, which was under the command of Metcalfe's 18-year-old son, Thomas. Thomas and all of the Fair American’s crew were killed, except for Isaac Davis, the sole survivor of the attack, who was tied to a canoe and left nearly dead. It is said that Davis's life was spared because of his brave fighting. An alternative historical account that originated in a Hawaiian language newspaper in the early 20th century states that Kamehameha did not kill the crew of the Fair American.

In March 1790, Simon Metcalfe left his boatswain, John Young, ashore and sailed away from the Hawaiian Islands without knowing that his son had been killed. The Fair American was taken over by Kamehameha.  Davis was nursed back to health by an American beachcomber named Isaac Ridler. Like his friend Young, Davis  assisted Kamehameha in his dealings with foreigners and in wars of conquest.

Davis was known as  Aikake,  the translation into Hawaiian, of his given name Isaac—from /ˈaɪzək/ to /ˈaɪzɑkɛ/, Isaac"eh", to /ˈaɪkəkɛ/ (Aikake). He was given the status of a high chief and married a relative of King Kamehameha I. He was appointed Governor of Oahu, and owned estates on Oahu, Maui, Molokai, and the Big Island.

Family

Davis first married Nakai Nalimaalualu, a chiefess with whom he had one daughter in 1797, Sarah (Sally or Kale) Kaniaulono Davis, named after his sister Sarah in Wales. Kale Davis lived in Honokaula, Maui, had six children and died in 1867.

After Nakai died in the ukuu plague, Davis married Kalukuna, a relative of Kamehameha, in Honolulu, and founded a prominent family in the islands. They had two children. His son George Hueu Davis was born on 10 January 1800. His daughter Elizabeth "Betty" Peke Davis was born on February 12, 1803. His son married Kahaanapilo Papa and Kalapuna and had many descendants; among them was his son Isaac Young Davis who was the second husband of Princess Ruth Keelikōlani and his granddaughter Lucy Kaopaulu Peabody who served as a maid of honor and lifelong companion to Queen Emma of Hawaii. His daughter Betty married George Prince Kaumualii (also known as Humehume), the son of King Kaumualii of Kauai.

After his death, his companion John Young looked after his children.  Two of them were living with him in 1807, and after Davis's murder in 1810 Young continued to care for them.  In Young's will, dated 1834, he divided his lands equally  between both his own and Davis's children.

Death
When King Kaumualii agreed to cede Kauai to Kamehameha and become a vassal ruler, the chiefs became angry. A plan was made to kill Kaumualii, while he was on Oahu. During a council of the other chiefs, Kamehameha's high priest Kalaikuahulu helped persuade Kamehameha not to kill Kaumualii. 

However, the other chiefs secretly continued the plan to poison King Kaumualii. Isaac Davis, learning of the plot, warned Kaumualii. Not waiting to attend the feast which was planned in his honor, Kaumualii slipped away and sailed for Kauai. The poison which was probably intended for Kaumualii was given to Isaac Davis, and he suddenly died in April 1810. He was buried in Honolulu, in "The Cemetery for Foreigners". On his tombstone was placed the inscription:

This cemetery is located near the Hawaii State Library in Honolulu.

Isaac Davis had been one of Kamehameha's closest friends and advisors. His death was a great shock to Kamehameha and cast a dark shadow over the satisfaction which the King must have felt with the peaceful settlement with the king of Kauai.

His nephew John Davis came to Hawaii in 1810 trying to find his uncle. John stayed and married a Hawaiian noble woman named Kauweʻa kanoaʻakaka wale no haleakala kaʻuwe kekiniʻokoolau (Daughter of Chief Kaukamoa and Chiefess Nahulanui). They had a son named Charles Kapuainahulu Davis who married Hannah Kuloloia Davis (maiden Kupaka 1826–1936), and had issue Tammer Keopualani Davis (Born 1856). John and "Kauwe" also had a daughter named Eliza Davis (1821–1912) who had daughters Hannah (1855–1938) and Mary with husband William Johnson (?–1863). Eliza later married William Roy (?–1905). Hannah Johnson would marry son of missionary John Davis Paris (1809–1892), and Mary would marry Hilo businessman William Herbert Shipman (1854–1943).

Family

References

Further reading

 

1758 births
1810 deaths
People from Milford Haven
Governors of Oahu
Hawaiian Kingdom people of Welsh descent
Royalty of the Hawaiian Kingdom
Hawaiian nobility
Hawaiian Kingdom politicians
Hawaiian Kingdom people
Sole survivors
Prisoners and detainees of the Hawaiian Kingdom
People murdered in Hawaii
British murder victims
British expatriates in the Hawaiian Kingdom
18th-century Welsh people
19th-century Welsh people
Nobility of the Americas